Trésor Kapuku Ngoy is a Congolese businessman, politician and Christian minister.

He is a former governor of Kasai-Occidental province. Hubert Mbingho was his vice-governor.
He was voted out of office by the provincial assembly on June 7, 2007, but the Supreme Court in Kinshasa challenged the disposal as unconstitutional.
He was succeeded as governor by Hubert Kabasubabo in 2011.

He owns a rock quarry business, and continues to seek the development of Kasaï-Central.

Trésor Kapuku Ngoy is married to Angelique. They have three sons and a daughter, who moved to the United States for their education.

References

Living people
Year of birth missing (living people)
People from Kasaï-Central
Governors of Kasai-Occidental
Governors of provinces of the Democratic Republic of the Congo
Kasai-Occidental